"Give Me One More Chance" is a song written by J.P. Pennington and Sonny LeMaire, and recorded by American country music group Exile.  It was released in July 1984 as the first single from the album Kentucky Hearts.  The song was Exile's third number one country hit.  The single went to number one for one week and spent a total of fifteen weeks on the country chart.

Charts

Weekly charts

Year-end charts

References

1984 singles
Exile (American band) songs
Songs written by J.P. Pennington
Song recordings produced by Buddy Killen
Epic Records singles
Songs written by Sonny LeMaire
1984 songs